Bela Čikoš Sesija (born Adalbert Csikos Sessia; 27 January 1864 in Osijek – 11 February 1931 in Zagreb) was a Croatian Symbolist painter, art teacher and one of the founders of the Academy of Fine Arts in Zagreb.

Biography 

Čikoš Sesija's father was a Captain in the border patrol of the Austro-Hungarian Empire. One of the Čikoš' ancestors was a hero at the Battle of the Sesia in 1524 and, as a result, was knighted with the name "Sesija".

Due to his father's reassignments, the family moved frequently and his education was sporadic until he entered the Cadet School at Karlovac in 1874. After graduation, in 1882, Čikoš Sesija was assigned to the 78th Osijek infantry regiment under Baron Josip Šokčević. He moved up in the ranks quickly, becoming a full Lieutenant in 1886, but resigned the following year because he refused to help support Károly Khuen-Héderváry's policy of Magyarization.

Despite having shown no particular aptitude for art, Čikoš Sesija enrolled at the Academy of Fine Arts Vienna, where he studied with Julius Victor Berger. While there he received two gold medals, in 1889 and 1891, for scenes depicting ancient history. In 1891, he also enrolled in a special course in Orientalist painting taught by Leopold Müller.

After Müller's death in 1892, he returned to Zagreb and participated in decorating the "Pompeian Room" at the local offices of the "Department of Education and Religious Affairs" (now occupied by the ""). His work there was supervised by the head of the department, Izidor Kršnjavi, who would become his patron and mentor. The first thing Kršnjavi did was send him on a study trip to Venice with Robert Frangeš-Mihanović and Ferdo Kovačević. This was followed by studies at the Academy of Fine Arts, Munich with Wilhelm Lindenschmit.

Čikoš Sesija then married his cousin Justine, then together embarked on another study trip to Italy. This was followed by more studies in Munich, with Carl von Marr, after which he settled in Zagreb, joining the circle of painters who gathered around Vlaho Bukovac. His mentor, Kršnjavi, was not happy about that, believing that Bukovac was a bad influence. This led to a conflict that caused him to leave Zagreb, in 1895, taking a job as a drawing teacher in Ogulin. A year later, he was back in Zagreb, with his own studio and reconciled with Kršnjavi.
 
In 1902, he left Zagreb again; this time largely for economic reasons, and traveled to America with fellow painter Robert Auer. After a mostly unsuccessful year, he came back and opened a private art school, together with Menci Klement Crnčić. Four years later he, Crnčić, Auer, Frangeš-Mihanović, Oton Iveković and Branko Šenoa would join together to help create the "Royal College for Arts and Crafts" (now the Academy of Fine Arts at the University of Zagreb).

In his later years Čikoš Sesija became increasingly withdrawn. He died suddenly, while at his easel, working on a canvas called "The Death of Innocence".

Works

References

Further reading 
 Vladimir Lunaček, Bela Čikoš Sesia, Zagreb, J. Čaklović, 1920.
 Radovan Vuković (ed.) Bela Csikos Sesia (1864-1931), "Za Psihom, sliko!" (For the Psyche, a Painting!) (exhibition catalog, 19 February - 11 March 2012.). Zagreb: Umjetnički paviljon, 2012.
 Vinko Zlamalik, Bela Čikoš Sesija: začetnik simbolizma u Hrvatskoj (The Originator of Symbolism in Croatia) (doctoral dissertation), University of Zagreb, Faculty of Philosophy, 1983.

External links 

"Sve Beline žene: supruga Justina, sluškinja Dora, Slava Raškaj.." (All of Bela's wives: Cousin Justine, maid Dora, Slava Raškaj...) by Patricia Kiš @ Jutarnji List 
"Slikar velikih ideja i velikih osjećanja" (A Painter of Great Ideas and Great Emotions) Exhibition notes by Feđa Gavrilović, from Vijenac, #467, January 26, 2012, @ Matica hrvatska
 Search results for Bela Čikoš Sesija @ Večernji List

1864 births
1931 deaths
People from Osijek
Members of the Croatian Academy of Sciences and Arts
Art Nouveau painters
Symbolist painters
19th-century Croatian people
19th-century Croatian painters
20th-century Croatian painters
Croatian male painters
Croatian people of Hungarian descent
19th-century Croatian male artists
20th-century Croatian male artists
Burials at Mirogoj Cemetery